The 2023 Campeonato Brasileiro Série C will be a football competition held in Brazil, equivalent to the third division. It will begin on 2 May and will end on 12 November 2023.

Twenty teams will compete in the tournament, twelve returning from the 2022 season, four promoted from the 2022 Campeonato Brasileiro Série D (Amazonas, América de Natal, Pouso Alegre and São Bernardo) and four relegated from the 2022 Campeonato Brasileiro Série B (Brusque, CSA, Náutico and Operário Ferroviário).

Format
The first stage will have one group where each team will play the other teams in a single round-robin tournament. The top eight teams will advance to the second stage, while the bottom four will be relegated. In the second stage, the teams will be divided into two groups of four teams each. Each group will be played on a home-and-away round-robin basis. The top two teams of each group will be promoted to the Série B, while the group winners will advance to the finals.

Teams

Number of teams by state

Stadiums and locations

Personnel and kits

Managerial changes

Notes

First stage
In the first stage, each team will play the other nineteen teams in a single round-robin tournament. The teams will be ranked according to points (3 points for a win, 1 point for a draw, and 0 points for a loss). If tied on points, the following criteria will be used to determine the ranking: 1. Wins; 2. Goal difference; 3. Goals scored; 4. Fewest red cards; 5. Fewest yellow cards; 6. Draw in the headquarters of the Brazilian Football Confederation (Regulations Article 16).

The top eight teams will advance to the second stage, while the bottom four will be relegated to Série D.

Group A

Results

Second stage
In the second stage, each group will be played on a home-and-away round-robin basis. The teams will be ranked according to points (3 points for a win, 1 point for a draw, and 0 points for a loss). If tied on points, the following criteria will be used to determine the ranking: 1. Wins; 2. Goal difference; 3. Goals scored; 4. Head-to-head (if the tie was only between two teams); 5. Fewest red cards; 6. Fewest yellow cards; 7. Draw in the headquarters of the Brazilian Football Confederation (Regulations Article 20).

The top two teams of each group will be promoted to the Série B. Group winners will advance to the finals.

Group B

Results

Group C

Results

Finals
The finals will be played on a home-and-away two-legged basis, with the higher-seeded team hosting the second leg. If tied on aggregate, the away goals rule will not be used, extra time will not be played, and the penalty shoot-out will be used to determine the champions (Regulations Article 21).

The finalists will be seeded according to their performance in the tournament. The teams will be ranked according to overall points. If tied on overall points, the following criteria will be used to determine the ranking: 1. Overall wins; 2. Overall goal difference; 3. Draw in the headquarters of the Brazilian Football Confederation (Regulations Article 22).

|}

Matches

References

Campeonato Brasileiro Série C seasons
3
2023 in Brazilian football